Events from the year 1960 in Michigan.

The top stories of the year in Michigan included: (1) the nomination and election of John Swainson, a 35-year-old double amputee, as Governor of Michigan; (2) the decision of G. Mennen Williams not to run for a seventh term as Governor; (3) the selection of Michigan's Nancy Fleming as Miss America; (4) John F. Kennedy's taking Michigan's electoral votes over Richard M. Nixon; (5) the selection of Robert McNamara as President of Ford Motor Company and then as Secretary of Defense; and (6) the Detroit Tigers' trade of batting champion Harvey Kuenn to the Cleveland Indians in exchange for Rocky Colavito.

Office holders

State office holders

 Governor of Michigan: G. Mennen Williams (Democrat)
 Lieutenant Governor of Michigan: John Swainson (Democrat) 
 Michigan Attorney General: Paul Adams
 Michigan Secretary of State: James M. Hare (Democrat)
 Speaker of the Michigan House of Representatives: Don R. Pears (Republican)
 Majority Leader of the Michigan Senate: Frank D. Beadle (Republican)
 Chief Justice, Michigan Supreme Court:

Mayors of major cities

 Mayor of Detroit: Louis Miriani
 Mayor of Grand Rapids: Stanley J. Davis
 Mayor of Flint: Robert J. Egan/Charles A. Mobley
 Mayor of Saginaw: R. Dewey Stearns
 Mayor of Dearborn: Orville L. Hubbard
 Mayor of Lansing: Ralph Crego
 Mayor of Ann Arbor: Cecil Creal

Federal office holders

 U.S. Senator from Michigan: Patrick V. McNamara (Democrat)
 U.S. Senator from Michigan: Philip Hart (Democrat) 
 House District 1: Thaddeus M. Machrowicz (Democrat)
 House District 2: George Meader (Republican)
 House District 3: August E. Johansen (Republican)
 House District 4: Clare Hoffman (Republican)
 House District 5: Gerald Ford (Republican)
 House District 6: Charles E. Chamberlain (Republican)
 House District 7: James G. O'Hara (Democrat)
 House District 8: Alvin Morell Bentley (Republican)
 House District 9: Robert P. Griffin (Republican)
 House District 10: Elford Albin Cederberg (Republican)
 House District 11: Victor A. Knox (Republican)
 House District 12: John B. Bennett (Republican)
 House District 13: Charles Diggs (Democrat)
 House District 14: Louis C. Rabaut (Democrat)
 House District 15: John Dingell Jr. (Democrat)
 House District 16: John Lesinski Jr. (Democrat)
 House District 17: Martha Griffiths (Democrat)
 House District 18: William Broomfield (Republican)

Population

Sports

Baseball
 1960 Detroit Tigers season – Under managers Jimmy Dykes and Joe Gordon (the subject of the first managerial trade in major league history on August 3), the Tigers compiled a 71–83 record and finished in sixth place in the American League. The team's statistical leaders included Norm Cash with a .286 batting average, Rocky Colavito with 35 home runs and 87 RBIs (as well as 80 strikeouts), Frank Lary with 15 wins, and Dave Sisler a 2.48 earned run average.
 1960 Michigan Wolverines baseball team - Under head coach Don Lund, the Wolverines compiled a 19–12–1 record. Bill Roman was the team captain.

American football
 1960 Detroit Lions season – The Lions, under head coach George Wilson, compiled a 7–5 record and finished in second place in the NFL's West Division. The team's statistical leaders included Jim Ninowski with 1,599 passing yards, Nick Pietrosante with 872 rushing yards, Gail Cogdill with 642 receiving yards, and Jim Martin with 65 points scored.
 1960 Michigan State Spartans football team – Under head coach Duffy Daugherty, the Spartans compiled a 6–2–1 record and were ranked No. 15 in the final AP Poll. The team's statistical leaders included Tom Wilson with 761 passing yards, Ron Hatcher with 361 rushing yards, and Herb Adderly with 154 receiving yards. 
 1960 Michigan Wolverines football team – Under head coach Bump Elliott, the Wolverines compiled a 5–4 record. The team's statistical leaders included Dave Glinka with 755 passing yards, Bennie McRae with 342 rushing yards, and Robert Johnson with 230 receiving yards. 
 1960 Detroit Titans football team – Under head coach Jim Miller, the Titans compiled a 7–2 record. Jerry Gross led the team in both passing yards (886) and rushing yards (343).
 1960 Western Michigan Broncos football team – Under head coach Merle Schlosser, the Broncos compiled a 4–4–1 record.
 1960 Wayne State Tartars football team – Under head coach Harold D. Willard, the Tartars compiled a 4–3 record.
 1960 Central Michigan Chippewas football team – Under head coach Kenneth "Bill" Kelly, the Chippewas compiled a 3–5 record. 
 1960 Eastern Michigan Hurons football team – Under head coach Fred Trosko, the Hurons compiled an 0–8–1 record.

Basketball

 1959–60 Detroit Pistons season – Under head coaches Red Rocha and Dick McGuire, the Pistons compiled a 30–45 record. The team's statistical leaders included Gene Shue with 1,712 points, Walter Dukes with 883 rebounds, and Dick McGuire with 358 assists.
 1959–60 Detroit Titans men's basketball team – The Titans compiled a 20–7 record under head coach Bob Calihan. Dave DeBusschere led the team with an average of 25.6 points per game.
 1959–60 Michigan State Spartans men's basketball team – Under head coach Forddy Anderson, the Spartans compiled a 10–11 record. Horace Walker led the team with an average of 22.5 points per game.
 1959–60 Michigan Wolverines men's basketball team – Under head coach William Perigo, the Wolverines compiled a 4–20 record. John Tidwell led the team with an average of 21.7 points per game.
 1959–60 Western Michigan Broncos men's basketball team – Under head coach Don Boven, the Broncos compiled a 13–11 record.

Ice hockey

 1959–60 Detroit Red Wings season – Under head coach Sid Abel, the Red Wings compiled a 29–29–15 record and lost to the Toronto Blue Jays in the semi-final round of the playoffs. Gordie Howe led the team with 28 goals, 45 assists, and 73 points. The team's regular goaltender was Terry Sawchuk.
 1959–60 Michigan Tech Huskies men's ice hockey team – Under head coach John MacInnes, Michigan Tech compiled a 21–10–1 record and placed second at the 1960 NCAA Division I Men's Ice Hockey Tournament, losing to Denver in the championship game.
 1959–60 Michigan Wolverines men's ice hockey season – Under head coach Al Renfrew, the Wolverines compiled a 12–12 record. 
 1959–60 Michigan State Spartans men's ice hockey team – Under head coach Amo Bessone, the Spartans compiled a 4–18–2 record.

1960 Olympics

The following athletes with ties to Michigan won medals in the 1960 Winter Olympics in Squaw Valley or the 1960 Summer Olympics in Rome:
 Carol Heiss, who trained for four years leading up to the Olympics at Michigan State University, won the gold medal in women's singles figure skating at Squaw Valley in February 1960.
 Betsy Snite, a native of Grand Rapids, won the silver medal in the women's slalom skiing event.
 Eddie Crook Jr. of Detroit won the gold medal in boxing's middleweight class.
 Gary Tobian, a Detroit native, won the gold medal in the men's 3 metre springboard diving event.
 Bob Webster of the University of Michigan won the gold medal in the men's 10 metre platform diving competition.
 Jeff Farrell, a Detroit native, won two gold medals in men's swimming in the 4 × 100 metre medley relay and the 4 × 200 metre freestyle relay.
 Joan Spillane of the University of Michigan won a gold medal in swimming in the 4 × 100 metre freestyle relay.
 Norbert Schemansky of Detroit won the bronze medal in the +90 kg class for weightlifting.
 Dave Gillanders of the University of Michigan won the bronze medal in the men's 200 metre butterfly swimming event.
 Eeles Landström of the University of Michigan won bronze medal in the pole vault.

Other
 Port Huron to Mackinac Boat Race – The X-Touche owned by Moon Baker and Jerry Clements of Detroit was the overall winner, finishing the race on July 18 in 53 hours, 8 minutes, and 51 seconds and a corrected time of 39 hours, 19 minutes, and 39 seconds.
 Michigan Open – John Barnum of Grand Rapids won the tournament on August 28 at the Lakepointe Country Club in Detroit. It was his third Michigan Open championship.

Chronology of events

January
 January 10 - McMorran Auditorium was dedicated in Port Huron, Michigan. At the ceremony, architect Alden Dow presented the keys to Wilbur S. Davidson. The auditorium, named after Henry McMorran, was built at a cost of $1.35 million. Plans were also announced to build a sports arena just west of the auditorium.  Opening night on January 11 featured "An Evening with Victor Borge, comedian-pianist.

February

March
 March 3 - G. Mennen Williams announced that he would not run for a seventh term as Governor of Michigan.

April
 April 12 - The Michigan Legislature passed a bill authorizing the creation of Grand Valley College in Grand Rapids, Michigan.

 April 17 - The Detroit Tigers traded Harvey Kuenn, the 1959 American League batting champion, to the Cleveland Indians for Rocky Colavito, who tied for the American League lead with 42 home runs.
 April 28 - William C. Newberg was named President of Chrysler Corporation. Lester L. (Tex) Colbert was promoted to board chairman. Newberg was forced out two months later on June 30 after it was revealed that he had substantial ownership interests in two companies that had supplied parts to Chrysler.

May
 May 20 - The freighters Standard Portland Cement and the Andrew Ziesing collided in the ship channel in lower Lake Huron two miles north of the Blue Water Bridge. The Standard Portland Cement, loaded with 8,000 tons of taconite, sank in 22 feet of water; all crew members survived.

June
 June 20 - Residents of Dearborn Heights voted to incorporate as a city.

July

August

 August 2 - Lt. Gov. John Swainson defeated Attorney General James M. Hare in an upset victory in the primary for the Democratic Party's nomination for Governor. Paul D. Bagwell was unopposed for the Republican Party's nomination.
 August 3 - After swapping batting stars in April, the Detroit Tigers and Cleveland Indians swapped managers, Joe Gordon coming to Detroit and Jimmy Dykes going to Cleveland. The deal was the first trade of managers in major league history.

September
 September 11 - Nancy Fleming of Montague, Michigan, was named Miss America for 1961 in Atlantic City, New Jersey.

October

 October 11 - John Fetzer bought out five other owners of the Detroit Tigers to become the club's controlling owner.
 October 13 - Cobo Hall, a convention center built at a cost of $54 million on the riverfront in Detroit, was dedicated before a crowd of 3,000 persons. The Detroit Free Press called it "a huge triumph of civic purpose."
 October 15–23 - The National Auto Show was held at Cobo Hall, the first time it was held in Detroit.
 October 21 - L. C. Walker Arena opened in Muskegon, Michigan. Opening night featured a hockey game in which the Muskegon Zephyrs lost to Toledo; attendance was approximately 2,000, far below the capacity of 6,000 persons. Vice President Richard M. Nixon appeared at the dedication ceremony on October 24.

November

 November 6 - The Detroit Times published its final issue after 60 years.
 November 8
 In the United States presidential election in Michigan, Democrat John F. Kennedy won the state's 20 electoral votes with 1,687,269 votes (50.85%) to 1,620,428 (48.84%) for Richard M. Nixon.
 In the U.S. Senate election, incumbent Democrat Patrick V. McNamara defeated Republican challenger Alvin Morell Bentley by a margin of 1,662,255 to 1,543,899.
 In the Michigan gubernatorial election, Democrat John Swainson, a 35-year-old veteran who lost both legs in World War II, defeated Republican Paul D. Bagwell by a margin of 40,000 votes out of 3.2 million ballots cast.
 In other statewide contests, T. John Lesinski defeated Clarence A. Reid for Lieutenant Governor, James M. Hare defeated William E. Kreger for Michigan Secretary of State, and Paul L. Adams defeated Wendell Alverson Miles for Michigan Attorney General.
 In U.S. House of Representatives elections, incumbents were re-elected in 17 of 18 districts. In District 8, Republican R. James Harvey was elected, replacing Alvin Morell Bentley who left the seat to run for the U.S. Senate.
 Michigan voters also approved ballot measures calling for a Constitutional Convention and raising the state sales tax to four percent. The latter proposal passed by a margin of 25,000 votes (0.1%) out of nearly 2.5 million votes cast.
 November 9 - Robert McNamara, at age 44, was named President of Ford Motor Company.
 November 30 - The Francisco Morazan, a Liberian freighter, ran aground off South Manitou Island in Lake Michigan. The ship was caught in a storm with 52-mile-per-hour winds and high swells. The pregnant wife of the captain was evacuated from the ship on December 1. The 14 remaining crew members were taken from the ship on December 5 as weather worsened and the ship's hull ruptured.

December

 December 1 - President Elect John F. Kennedy nominated G. Mennen Williams as Assistant Secretary of State for African Affairs.
 December 13 - President Elect Kennedy nominated Robert McNamara as United States Secretary of Defense. McNamara had been named President of Ford Motor Company one month earlier.

Births
 January 13 - Eric Betzig, physicist who won Nobel Prize for the development of super-resolved fluorescence microscopy, in Ann Arbor, Michigan
 January 26 - Carol Yager, the heaviest woman ever recorded (peak weight estimated at 1,600 pounds), in Flint, Michigan
 March 8 - Jeffrey Eugenides, Pulitzer Prize-winning novelist (The Virgin Suicides, Middlesex) and short story writer, in Detroit
 April 16 - Curt Young, Major League Baseball pitcher (1983–1993), in Saginaw, Michigan
 May 24 - Pete Metzelaars, NFL tight end (1982–1997), in Three Rivers, Michigan
 June 7 - Jim Paciorek, professional baseball player, mostly in Japan (1987–1993), in Detroit
 June 7 - Bill Prady, television and producer (co-creator of The Big Bang Theory and The Muppets), in Detroit
 October 10 - Charles R. Perricone, 67th Speaker of the Michigan House of Representatives (1999-2000)
 October 16 - Dave Trott, U.S. Congressman starting in 2015, in Birmingham, Michigan
 November 3 - Karch Kiraly, volleyball player and 3x Olympic gold medalist, in Jackson, Michigan
 November 7 - Penny Neer, collegiate and Olympic athlete in discus throwing, basketball and softball, in Hillsdale, Michigan
 November 25 - Ray Bentley, USFL/NFL linebacker (1983–1992), in Grand Rapids, Michigan
 December 10 - Paul Assenmacher, Major League Baseball pitcher (1986–1999), in Detroit

Gallery of 1960 births

Deaths
 May 2 - Caryl Chessman, convicted robber, kidnapper, and rapist, and native of St. Joseph, Michigan, at age 38 in the gas chamber at San Quentin, California
 June 9 - Harry S. Hammond, one of the leading scorers on Michigan's 1904 and 1905 "Point-a-Minute" football teams, at age 75 in Westport, Connecticut
 August 9 - Adam Brown, left wing for Detroit Red Wings (1941-1947), at age 40 at Hamilton, Ontario
 September 13 - Paul Weatherwax, Academy Award-winning film editor (The Naked City, Around the World in 80 Days'') and native of Sturgis, Michigan, at age 60 in West Hollywood, California
 November 5 - Miller Pontius, All-American football player at Michigan in 1913, at age 69 in New York City
 December 26 - Fred Knorr, radio executive and part owner of the Detroit Tigers since 1956, at age 47 as a result of burns suffered on December 9 in Fort Lauderdale, Florida
 December 31 - Roy A. Young, Chairman of the Federal Reserve Board (1927-1930) and native of Marquette, Michigan, at age 78 in Chestnut Hill, Massachusetts

Gallery of 1960 deaths

See also
 History of Michigan
 History of Detroit

References